The Visit Hampton Virginia 150 was a NASCAR K&N Pro Series race held annually at Langley Speedway in Hampton, Virginia.

Past winners

 2013: Race extended to a green-white-checker finish.
 2017: Race postponed from Saturday, September 2 to Monday, September 4 due to rain.

References

External links
 

NASCAR races
Tourist attractions in Hampton, Virginia
ARCA Menards Series East
2011 establishments in Virginia
2018 disestablishments in Virginia
NASCAR races at Langley Field Speedway